Tuska (also Romanized as Tūskā; also known as Toskā) is a village in Mian Band Rural District, in the Central District of Nur County, Mazandaran Province, Iran. At the 2006 census, its population was 474, in 115 families.

References 

Populated places in Nur County